Ali Şahin (born 1934) is a Turkish politician who served as a Member of Parliament for Kahramanmaraş from Social Democratic Populist Party (SHP) between 1987–1991, from Republican People's Party (CHP) between 1995–1999.

References 

1934 births
Ankara University Faculty of Law alumni
Members of the 18th Parliament of Turkey
Members of the 20th Parliament of Turkey
Social Democratic Populist Party (Turkey) politicians
Republican People's Party (Turkey) politicians
Turkish judges
Deputies of Kahramanmaraş
People from Kahramanmaraş
Living people